The Kammweg ("Ridgeway") was a long-distance path opened in 1904 along the crest of the  Elster Mountains,  Ore Mountains, Bohemian Switzerland, Lusatian Mountains, Ještěd Mountains, Jizera and Giant Mountains, Śnieżnik Mountains and High Ash Mountains. This path was once the longest tourist trail in the German-speaking region of Europe. Since 2011 the ridgeway tradition has been continued with the Ore Mountains-Vogtland Ridgeway (Kammweg Erzgebirge–Vogtland), which runs on the German side of the border.

History 
The planned route was to run along all the mountains along the German border with Bohemia and Moravian Silesia from the Danube to the Oder. At its longest, the path ran all the way from the Háj u Aše (German: Hainberg) near Aš (Asch) to the Praděd (Altvater) in the High Ash Mountains.

After 1945, the continuous signing of the route was abandoned, most parts of the trail were, however, preserved as hiking trails. After 1990, the E3 European long distance path was newly signed, largely following the historical route.

Ore Mountains-Vogtland Ridgeway 
On 13 May 2011, the Ore Mountains-Vogtland Ridgeway (Kammweg Erzgebirge–Vogtland) was opened. This runs entirely on the German side of the border. It begins in Geising in the Eastern Ore Mountains and ends after 289 kilometres in Blankenstein in Thuringia, where it connects to the Rennsteig and Frankenweg. The main sponsor of the Ore Mountains – Vogtland Ridgeway are the Ore Mountain Tourist Association and Vogtland Tourist Association. The community project was achieved with assistance from the communes and counties on the ridgeway, the Saxony Forestry Commission, the Ore Mountain–Vogtland Nature Park and the hiking clubs in the Vogtland, Ore Mountains and Franconian Forest. The ridgeway is certified as a "quality route".

Course: Geising – Altenberg – Rehefeld – above Holzhau – Rechenberg-Bienenmühle – Clausnitz – Friedebach – Neuhausen – Seiffen – oberhalb Olbernhau – Rübenau – Kühnhaide – Reitzenhain – Satzung – Schmalzgrube – Jöhstadt-Schlössel – Königswalde – Bärenstein – Neudorf/Kretscham-Rothensehma – Fichtelberg (1214.7 m) – Oberwiesenthal – Tellerhäuser – Rittersgrün – Johanngeorgenstadt – Auersberg (1019 m) – Wildenthal – Weitersglashütte – Carlsfeld – Mühlleithen – Muldenberg – Schöneck – Hermsgrün – Leubetha – above Eichigt – Bobenneukirchen – Burgstein/Krebes – Gutenfürst – Gebersreuth – Hirschberg – Pottiga – Blankenberg – Blankenstein.

The Kammweg is divided into the following 17 stages:

Signing 

The old ridgeway was marked locally with a "comb" sign (Kammweg = "crest way" or "ridgeway", but Kamm also means "comb")

Signposts for the Ore Mountains - Vogtland Ridgeway.

Literature 
 Einsteigen und Abschalten. Übersichtskarte Kammweg Erzgebirge – Vogtland. Tourismusverband Erzgebirge e. V. 2011

External links 
 Ore Mountains Ridgeway
 Stages
 Website of the Ore Mountains - Vogtland Ridgeway
 Kammweg Erzgebirge – Vogtland at Ore Mountain Tourist Association (Tourismusverband Erzgebirge)
 History of the old Ridgeway

Hiking trails in Germany
Sport in Saxony
1904 establishments in Germany